On August 12, 1883, the astronomer José Bonilla reported that he saw more than 300 dark, unidentified objects crossing before the Sun while observing sunspot activity at Zacatecas Observatory in Mexico. He was able to take several photographs, exposing wet plates at 1/100 second. Bonilla's photos have been credited with being some of the earliest photos of unidentified flying objects. The objects were subsequently identified as high-flying geese.

In 2011, researchers from the National Autonomous University of Mexico suggested that the unidentified objects may have been fragments of an estimated billion-ton comet passing within a few hundred kilometers of Earth.

Similar comet fragments may have caused the Younger Dryas event, around 12,900 years ago.

References

UFO sightings
Comets
1883 in Mexico
Zacatecas
Historical events in Mexico